Ferussacia is a genus of air-breathing land snails, terrestrial pulmonate gastropod mollusks in the family Ferussaciidae.

Species
Species within the genus Ferussacia include:
 Ferussacia attenuata (Mousson, 1872)
 Ferussacia carnea (Risso, 1826)
 † Ferussacia convoluta Paladilhe, 1873 
 Ferussacia folliculum (Schröter, 1784)
 Ferussacia fritschi (Mousson, 1872)
 Ferussacia hierosolymarum
 Ferussacia lanzarotensis (Mousson, 1872)
 Ferussacia mabilliana
 † Ferussacia martinae Groh & Henkel, 2019 
 Ferussacia submajor (Wollaston, 1878)
 † Ferussacia tassaroliana Sacco, 1889 
 Ferussacia tumidula (Wollaston, 1878)
 Ferussacia valida (Mousson, 1872)
 Ferussacia vitrea (Webb & Berthelot, 1833)

References

 Pfeiffer L. (1876-1877). Monographia Heliceorum viventium. Sistens descriptiones systematicas et criticas omnium huius familiae generum et specierum hodie cognitarum. Volumen octavum. (1): 1–160 [1876, < 26 May]; (2): 161–320 [1876, < 30 September]; (3): 321–480 [1876, November or (more likely) December]; (4): 481–729 [1877, 1 April]. Lipsiae: F.A. Brockhaus
 Bank, R. A. (2017). Classification of the Recent terrestrial Gastropoda of the World. Last update: July 16th, 2017

External links 
 Risso A. (1826). Histoire naturelle des principales productions de l'Europe méridionale et particulièrement de celles des environs de Nice et des Alpes Maritimes, vol. 4. Paris: Levrault. vii + 439 pp., pls 1-12
 Pfeiffer L. (1876-1877). Monographia Heliceorum viventium. Sistens descriptiones systematicas et criticas omnium huius familiae generum et specierum hodie cognitarum. Volumen octavum. (1): 1–160 [1876, < 26 May; (2): 161–320 [1876, < 30 September]; (3): 321–480 [1876, November or (more likely) December]; (4): 481–729 [1877, < 1 April]. Lipsiae: F.A. Brockhaus]

Ferussaciidae
Taxonomy articles created by Polbot